A17, A 17, A.17 or A-17 is a three-letter acronym that may refer to:
 A17 Cutty Sark, a 1930 British Saro aircraft
 A17 road, in several countries
 Aero A.17, a 1922 Czech sailplane
 ARM Cortex-A17, a microprocessor core
 British NVC community A17 (Ranunculus penicillatus ssp. pseudofluitans community), a British Isles plant community
 Focke-Wulf A 17, an airliner
 Northrop A-17, an aircraft

This acronym may also refer to:
 One of the Encyclopaedia of Chess Openings codes for the English Opening in chess
 Subfamily A17, a rhodopsin-like receptors subfamily